Lynda Jean Carter (born July 24, 1951) is an American actress, singer, and beauty pageant titleholder who was crowned Miss World USA 1972 and finished in the top 15 at the Miss World 1972 pageant.

Carter is best known as the star of the live-action television series Wonder Woman, in the role of Diana Prince / Wonder Woman. The role was based on the DC comic book fictional superhero character of the same name, and aired on ABC and later on CBS from 1975 to 1979.

Early life 
Carter was born in Phoenix, Arizona, the daughter of Juanita (née Córdova) and Colby Carter. Her father is of English and Scots-Irish ancestry, and her mother, whose family hailed from Mexico, is of Mexican, Spanish, and French descent. She has one brother, Vincent, and one sister, Pamela. 

Carter made her public television debut on Lew King's Talent Show at age 5. During high school, Carter performed in a band called Just Us. The band included a marimba, a conga drum, an acoustic guitar, and a stand-up bass which was played by another girl in the group. At age 15, Lynda began singing in the local pizza parlor to earn extra money. When she was 16, she joined two of her cousins in another band called The Relatives. Actor Gary Burghoff was the drummer for the band. The group opened at the Sahara Hotel and Casino lounge in Las Vegas for three months; because Carter was under 21 she had to enter through the kitchen.

Carter attended Arizona State University. After being voted "Most Talented", she dropped out to pursue a career in music. In 1970, Carter successfully auditioned for and then sang on tour with The Garfin Gathering and bandleader Howard (Speedy) Garfin. Their first performance together was at the Holiday Inn Chinatown, a San Francisco hotel so new that it had no completed sidewalk entrance. Consequently, they played mostly to the hotel staff and hotel guests who parked their cars in the underground garage. The Garfin Gathering toured the Nevada "Silver Circuit", playing shows in many of the state's casino lounges between Lake Tahoe, Carson City, Reno, and Las Vegas. In 1972, Carter decided to leave the Garfin Gathering to pursue an acting career, returning to Arizona.

Career 

In 1972, Carter won a local Arizona beauty contest and gained national attention in the United States by winning Miss World USA 1972, representing Arizona. In the international Miss World 1972 pageant, representing the United States she reached the Top 15. She took acting classes at several New York acting schools during the early 1970s. One of her acting partners during this time was future CBS president Les Moonves. Carter made her first acting appearance in an episode of the 1974 police drama Nakia entitled "Roots of Anger". She began making appearances on such TV shows as Starsky and Hutch and Cos, as well as appearances in several "B" movies.

Wonder Woman 

Wonder Woman, the fictional superhero character, was created by the American psychologist and writer William Moulton Marston and artist Harry G. Peter in 1941 for DC Comics. Conceived in the wake of the popularity of Superman, Marston designed his creation as counter-programming to the Man of Steel. The Diana Prince/Wonder Woman character is also called the Amazing Amazon, the Spirit of Truth, Themyscira's Champion, and the Goddess of Love and War. Wonder Woman was an instant hit with readers and became the most prominent DC comic book female superhero.

Carter's acting career took off when she landed the starring role on Wonder Woman in 1975, as the title character and her secret identity, Diana Prince. The savings she had set aside from her days of touring on the road with her band to pursue acting in Los Angeles were almost exhausted. Carter has publicly stated that, on the day she got the part, she had $25 in the bank. She was close to returning to Arizona when her manager informed her that Joanna Cassidy had lost the role and Carter had the part of Wonder Woman. Carter's earnest performance greatly endeared her to both fans and critics and as a result, she continues to be closely identified with Wonder Woman.

The Wonder Woman series lasted for three seasons, which aired on ABC and later on CBS from 1975 to 1979. Carter's performance, rooted in the character's inherent goodness combined with a comic-accurate costume and a catchy theme song made for a depiction that was nothing less than iconic. After the show ended, Carter told Us that "I never meant to be a sexual object for anyone but my husband. I never thought a picture of my body would be tacked up in men's bathrooms. I hate men looking at me and thinking what they think. And I know what they think. They write and tell me."

In 2017, Carter explained her perspective of portraying the Diana Prince/Wonder Woman character. Carter says she got the role back in 1975 largely because she looked the part which was both a blessing and—as one of the show's producers warned her—a curse, saying that “Oh, women are going to be so jealous of you.” Carter had responded, “Not a chance. They won't be, because I am not playing her that way. I want women to want to be me, or be my best friend!". As Carter describes portraying Wonder Woman, "There is something about the character where in your creative mind for that time in your life where you pretended to be her, or whatever the situation was, that it felt like you could fly".

In 1985, DC Comics named Carter as one of the honorees in the company's 50th anniversary publication Fifty Who Made DC Great for her work on the Wonder Woman series.

In 2007, DC Direct released a  full-figure statue of Carter as Wonder Woman, limited to 5,000 pieces; it was re-released in 2010. Also in 2010, DC Direct began selling a  bust of Carter's Wonder Woman to celebrate the 75th anniversary of DC Comics.

During production of the 2017 Wonder Woman feature film, director Patty Jenkins approached Carter to appear in a cameo role in the film, as Carter confirmed, "Patty asked me to do a cameo in this. She was in England, and I was doing my concerts," explaining she had singing engagements that made her unavailable. "At that time we couldn't get our timing together. So, this next time, if she writes me a decent part, I might do it." Carter did make a cameo in the post-credits scene of the sequel film, Wonder Woman 1984 where she plays Asteria, the "Golden Warrior" of the Amazons.

Carter holds dear the new film and the character introduced more than 75 years ago. "Many actresses or actors, they want to divorce themselves from a role because we are actors, we really aren't the people that we play. But I knew very early on that this character is much more than me certainly, and to try to divorce myself from the experiences that other people have of the character is silly," she said.

Music and promotional work 
While Wonder Woman was being produced, Carter was well recognized and in demand for promotional work. In 1978, Carter was voted "The Most Beautiful Woman in the World" by the International Academy of Beauty and the British Press Organization. She had also signed a modelling contract with Maybelline cosmetics in 1977. In 1979, she appeared in a Diet 7Up commercial along with comedian Don Rickles.

Carter was the first woman to provide a voiceover for a movie trailer, as she did for the 1975 film The Drowning Pool.

Carter continued to pursue her interest in music. During the late 1970s she recorded the album Portrait. Carter is credited in several variety television programs for being a co-writer on several songs and making numerous musical guest appearances. She also sang two of her songs in a 1979 Wonder Woman episode, "Amazon Hot Wax".

In 1977, Carter released a promotional poster through Pro Arts at the suggestion of her then-husband and manager, Ron Samuels. The poster was very successful despite Carter's dissatisfaction with it. In 1981 during an interview on the NBC television special Women Who Rate a 10, she said:

It's uncomfortable because I just simply took a photograph. That's all my participation was in my poster that sold over a million copies, was that I took a photograph that I thought was a dumb photograph. My husband said, "Oh, try this thing tied up here, it'll look beautiful". And the photographer said "the back-lighting is really terrific". So dealing with someone having that picture up in their... bedroom or their... living room or whatever I think would be hard for anyone to deal with.

For Apocalypse Now (1979) she was originally cast in the role of Playboy Playmate Bunny, but the filming of her scenes was interrupted by the storm that wrecked the theater set prompting a delay of nearly two months for rebuilding. By the time director Francis Ford Coppola was ready to shoot again, Carter's contractual obligations to Wonder Woman had forced her back to the States and her scenes were reshot with Colleen Camp. The only evidence remaining of Carter's involvement are the Playboy centerfolds that were specially shot by the magazine as movie props, and a glimpse of Carter's pinup in the Redux version.

Life after Wonder Woman: music, film and television 

 
After Wonder Woman ended, Carter had many opportunities in music, film, and television. In 1980 Carter initially made a guest appearance on The Muppet Show. In the episode's running gag, Kermit the Frog repeatedly reminds the other Muppets that their guest is Carter and not Wonder Woman. This is to no avail as the Muppets ineptly attempt to become superheroes by taking a correspondence course and Miss Piggy portrays "Wonder Pig", a spoof of Carter's television character.

She was quickly given a variety of her own musical TV specials, including Lynda Carter's Special (1980), Encore! (1980), Celebration (1981), Street Life (1982), and Body and Soul (1984). She landed the title role in a biographical film about actress Rita Hayworth (born Margarita Carmen Cansino) titled Rita Hayworth: The Love Goddess (1983).

Carter's next major role after Wonder Woman was in the crime drama television series Partners in Crime with Loni Anderson in 1984. She then portrayed Helen Durant in the 1989 CBS television film Mike Hammer: Murder Takes All where she booby-traps Las Vegas entertainer Johnny Roman (Edward Winter), her husband Doctor Carl Durant, and his employee accountant Brad Peters (Jim Carrey) causing their deaths.

Throughout the 1990s, Carter appeared in a string of television movies which resulted in a resurgence in television appearances for her. She appeared in commercials for Lens Express (now 1-800 Contacts). Around that time Carter created her own production company, Potomac Productions. In 1993, Carter expanded her performance resume to include voice-over work as the narrator for the Sandra Brown book Where There's Smoke.

New millennium 
The new millennium saw Carter continuing to work in various areas. Because of the resyndication of Wonder Woman on cable networks like FX and SyFy, Carter participated in two scheduled on-line chat sessions with fans. In 2000, Carter hosted the I Love 1978 episode of BBC2's I Love the '70s. In 2004, she won an award for being the "Superest Superhero" on the Second Annual TV Land Awards the same year. When an announcer reported that an invisible plane was double-parked illegally and needed to be moved before it was towed, she performed her spinning transformation once again after 25 years, although a younger actress wore the star-spangled outfit at that moment.

Carter performed in a variety of film roles, making up a majority of her film work in the 2000s. In 2001, she was cast in the independent comedy feature Super Troopers, as Vermont Governor Jessman. The writers and stars of the film, the comedy troupe Broken Lizard along with the director Jay Chandrasekhar had specifically sought Carter for the role. Inspired by the character detour from her usual roles, she agreed to play a washed-up, former beauty queen in The Creature of the Sunny Side Up Trailer Park (2004) which was directed by Christopher Coppola.

Carter made her first appearance in a major feature film in a number of years in the big-screen remake of The Dukes of Hazzard (2005), also directed by Chandrasekhar. She appeared in Disney's action comedy film Sky High (2005) as Principal Powers, the headmistress of a school for superheroes. The script allowed Carter to poke fun at her most famous character when she states: "I can't do anything more to help you. I'm not Wonder Woman, y’know.” In 2006, she guest-starred in the made-for-cable vampire film Slayer. The following year Carter returned to the DC Comics' television world in the Smallville episode "Progeny" (2007), playing Chloe Sullivan's Kryptonite-empowered mother.

Carter expanded her voice-over work to include video games, performing voices for the nord and orsimer (orc) females in two computer games of The Elder Scrolls series beginning in 2002, and including The Elder Scrolls III: Morrowind, The Elder Scrolls IV: Oblivion, and The Elder Scrolls V: Skyrim. These games were developed by Bethesda Softworks; her husband, businessman Robert A. Altman was chairman and CEO of Bethesda's parent company, ZeniMax Media.

Carter decided to do a variety of theater projects. From September to November 2005, Carter played "Mama Morton" in the West End London production of Chicago. In 2006, her rendition of "When You're Good to Mama" was officially released on the Chicago: 10th Anniversary Edition CD box set. In May 2007, Carter began touring the U.S. with her one-woman musical cabaret show, An Evening with Lynda Carter. She played engagements at such venues as Feinstein's at Loews Regency in New York, Jazz at Lincoln Center, the Kennedy Center in Washington, D.C., the Razz Room in San Francisco, and the Catalina Jazz Club in Los Angeles. In June 2009, her second album, At Last was released and reached No. 10 on Billboard's Jazz Albums Chart. In June 2011, Carter released her third album, Crazy Little Things which she describes as a delightful mix of standards, country, and pop tunes. In 2015, Carter wrote and recorded five original songs for the video game Fallout 4 in which she herself stars. An EP of the songs from the game's soundtrack was released on iTunes on November 6, 2015. The song "Good Neighbor" from the EP was nominated by NAVGTR for best song under the category of Song, Original or Adapted. In 2018, Carter released her fourth album titled Red, Rock n' Blues with her All-Star Band which featured two vocals with her daughter, Jessica Altman. She continues to perform her concerts nationally at venues including The Kennedy Center in Washington, D.C., Catalina Jazz Club in Hollywood, Feinstein's at the Nikko in San Francisco, the Franklin Theater in Nashville, and Jazz at Lincoln Center in NYC. Lynda performs with her All-Star Band and presents her special guest, Jessica Altman. Jessica released her own EP "No Rules" in early 2020.

Recent work 

Carter is among the interview subjects in Superheroes: A Never-Ending Battle, a three-hour documentary narrated by Liev Schreiber that premiered on PBS in October 2013.

Carter, fellow Wonder Woman actress Gal Gadot, DC Entertainment President Diane Nelson, Wonder Woman director Patty Jenkins, and U.N. Under-Secretary General Cristina Gallach appeared at the United Nations on October 21, 2016, the 75th anniversary of the first appearance of Wonder Woman to mark the character's designation by the United Nations as its "Honorary Ambassador for the Empowerment of Women and Girls". The gesture was intended to raise awareness of UN Sustainable Development Goal No. 5, which seeks to achieve gender equality and empower all women and girls by 2030. However the decision was met with protests from UN staff members who stated in their petition to UN Secretary-General Ban Ki-moon that the character is "not culturally encompassing or sensitive", and served to objectify women. As a result the character was stripped of the designation and the project ended on December 16.

In 2017, Carter rejoined the Warner Bros./DC Comics film and television family on the second season of The CW's Supergirl television series in the role of President Olivia Marsdin. Executive producer Andrew Kreisberg described Carter's presence on the show as "a big stand to necessitate Supergirl (Melissa Benoist) and the DEO protecting her".

Personal life 

Lynda Carter and the French singer Michel Polnareff had a romantic relationship in 1973 before she played the role of Wonder Woman.

Carter has been married twice. Her first marriage was to her former talent agent, Ron Samuels, from 1977 to 1982, a period in which she has publicly stated that she was very unhappy. On January 29, 1984, she married Washington, D.C. attorney Robert A. Altman, law partner of Clark Clifford and later co-founder CEO of ZeniMax Media. She left Hollywood in 1985 to join her husband in Washington, D.C. for a few years. Carter and her husband have two children: James Altman (born January 14, 1988) and Jessica Carter Altman (born October 7, 1990). The couple lived in Potomac, Maryland a home they built in 1987, shortly before the birth of their son. The 20,000 square foot Georgian-style mansion was profiled in the premiere issue of Closer magazine in November 2013, as well as on HGTV.

In 1993, after a lengthy and highly publicized jury trial stemming from his involvement with the Bank of Credit and Commerce International and its secret acquisition of First American Bankshares Inc., Altman was acquitted. Carter was seen on the TV news with her arm around him, declaring, "Not guilty! Not guilty!" to the gathered reporters. On February 3, 2021, Altman died at a hospital in Baltimore owing to a battle with myelofibrosis, a rare form of leukemia; he was 73.

In 2003, Carter revealed that her mother had suffered from irritable bowel syndrome for over 30 years leading to Carter touring the country as an advocate and spokeswoman. Carter is also a staunch advocate and supporter of Susan G. Komen for the Cure, abortion rights, and legal equality for LGBT people. She was the Grand Marshal for the 2011 Phoenix Pride Parade and the 2011 New York Pride Parades, as well as the 2013 Capital Pride Parade in Washington, D.C. In 2010 she served as Grand Marshall for the Washington, D.C. AIDS Walk.

In a June 4, 2008, interview with People magazine, Carter stated that she had in the past entered a rehabilitation clinic for treatment of alcoholism and that she had been sober for nearly 10 years. When she was asked what the recovery process had taught her, Carter explained that the best measure of a human being is "how we treat the people who love us, and the people that we love".

Carter states that she is committed to her recovery from alcoholism and addiction. She credits her husband's intervention for her ultimate acceptance of personal powerlessness over alcoholism, stating in a 2016 Council on Recovery interview that, "After 18 years of recovery, I live every day with immense gratitude. I am forever thankful for my family and friends who stood by me and encouraged me… and for those who helped me heal." 

The following is press material produced by Carter and her staff regarding her experience of alcoholism:

“Through her inspiring story, Carter shares the power and grace of vulnerability, faith, and surrender that she believes nourish lasting recovery. Celebrating over 20 years of sobriety, Carter continues to guest speak at various health and well-being events. Her recovery story and its message of hope is directed to every member of the family. It is a strong reminder that family support can make a huge difference to a recovering addict or alcoholic.”

Honors 
In 1985, DC Comics named Carter as one of the honorees in the company's 50th anniversary publication Fifty Who Made DC Great for her work on the Wonder Woman series.

In 2014, a Golden Palm Star on the Palm Springs, California, Walk of Stars was dedicated to Carter's career. Carter's dedication is the 369th honoree on the Palm Springs Walk of Stars.

In 2016, Carter received a Lifetime Achievement Award at the Gracie Awards. The Gracie Awards ceremony is presented by the Alliance for Women in Media Foundation (AWM), since 1975.

On April 3, 2018, the Hollywood Chamber of Commerce (HCC) proudly honored Carter with the 2,632nd star on the Hollywood Walk of Fame. The star is at 6562 Hollywood Boulevard in the television section. HCC President and CEO Leron Gubler unveiled the star with the assistance of guest speakers, director Patty Jenkins and former CBS chairman Leslie Moonves.

On September 17, 2022, the National Museum of Mexican Art in Chicago honored Carter with the Sor Juana Legacy Award for her outstanding contributions to the arts. The Sor Juana Legacy Award recognizes women of Mexican descent for their lifetime achievements.

On December 13, 2022, Carter, along with a handful of others, were inducted into the California Hall of Fame.

Filmography

Film

Television

Video games

Discography

Studio albums

Singles

References

External links 

 

1951 births
Actresses from Phoenix, Arizona
American actresses of Mexican descent
American beauty pageant winners
American women singers
American feminists
American film actresses
American people of English descent
American people of French descent
American people of Scotch-Irish descent
American television actresses
American video game actresses
American voice actresses
Audiobook narrators
Arizona State University alumni
Feminist musicians
Hispanic and Latino American actresses
American LGBT rights activists
Living people
Maryland Democrats
Miss World 1972 delegates
Hispanic and Latino American female models
20th-century American actresses
21st-century American actresses
21st-century American women